"Rock the Party" is a song written and performed by American rapper Raymond "Benzino" Scott and featuring singer-songwriter Mario "Yellowman" Winans. It was released on September 3, 2002 via Elektra Records as the lead single from Benzino's second solo studio album Redemption. Recording sessions took place at Planet 2 Planet in New York with Wayne Allison. Production was handled by Winans. It was mixed by Paul Logus at the Hit Factory Criteria in Miami and mastered by Chris Gehringer at Sterling Sound in New York. Young Heff remixed version featured guest verses from Lil' Kim and Petey Pablo.

The song peaked at number 82 on the Billboard Hot 100, number 28 on the Hot R&B/Hip-Hop Songs, and number 31 on the Rhythmic Airplay, marking it Benzino's highest charted single to date. The song also appeared on the US version of The Transporter: Music from and Inspired by the Motion Picture, and later was featured in the 2002 film I-SPY and the 2003 video game NBA Street Vol. 2.

Track listing

Personnel 
Raymond "Benzino" Scott – main artist, songwriter
Mario Winans – featured artist, songwriter, producer
Michael Carlos Jones – songwriter
Wayne "The Brain" Allison – recording
Paul Logus – mixing
Chris Gehringer – mastering

Charts

References

External links 
 

2002 songs
2002 singles
Elektra Records singles
Songs written by Mario Winans